The Diocese of San Francisco de Asís de Jutiapa is a Latin Church ecclesiastical territory or diocese of the Catholic Church in Guatemala. It is a suffragan diocese in the ecclesiastical province of the Archdiocese of Santiago de Guatemala. The diocese's name refers to Francis of Assisi.

Its cathedral is the Catedral San Cristóbal in the episcopal see of Jutiapa, southwestern Guatemala.

History 
Established on 25 January 2016 as the Diocese of San Francisco de Asís de Jutiapa on territory split off from the Diocese of Jalapa.

Episcopal ordinaries 
Bishops of San Francisco de Asís de Jutiapa
 Bishop Antonio Calderón Cruz (2016.01.25 – ...)

References

External links 
 GCatholic 

Roman Catholic dioceses in Guatemala
Christian organizations established in 2016
Roman Catholic dioceses and prelatures established in the 21st century
Roman Catholic Ecclesiastical Province of Santiago de Guatemala